Small pondweed is a common name for several plants and may refer to:

Potamogeton berchtoldii
Potamogeton pusillus